John Goldie (born 19 January 1985) is a former Scottish professional darts player who competes in Professional Darts Corporation events.

He won a two-year PDC Tour Card in January 2018.

References

External links

1985 births
Living people
Professional Darts Corporation former tour card holders
People from Alloa
Scottish darts players
Sportspeople from Clackmannanshire